Segun Olayinka (born 12 August 1988) is a Nigerian cricketer. He played in the 2013 ICC World Cricket League Division Six tournament. In October 2021, he was named in Nigeria's Twenty20 International (T20I) squad for their series against Sierra Leone. He made his T20I debut on 26 October 2021, for Nigeria against Sierra Leone. In October 2021, he was named in Nigeria's squad for the Regional Final of the 2021 ICC Men's T20 World Cup Africa Qualifier tournament in Rwanda.

References

External links
 

1988 births
Living people
Nigerian cricketers
Place of birth missing (living people)
Wicket-keepers